Alfred Antoine de Rauch (1 June 1887 – 20 July 1948) was a French ice hockey player.

Career
De Rauch was born in Warsaw and played for the France men's national ice hockey team at the 1920 Summer Olympics in Antwerp, the 1924 Winter Olympics in Chamonix, and the 1928 Winter Olympics in St. Moritz. He won a silver medal with his team at the 1923 European Championship. At the 1924 European Championship, he won a gold medal with France.

At the club level, he won the French Championship with Club des Patineurs de Paris in 1911-12 and 1921-22.

Achievements
 1912 French champion with Club des Patineurs de Paris
 1922 French champion with Club des Patineurs de Paris
 1923 Silver medal at the European Championship
 1924 Gold medal at the European Championship

References

External links
 

1887 births
1948 deaths
Emigrants from the Russian Empire to France
Ice hockey players at the 1920 Summer Olympics
Ice hockey players at the 1924 Winter Olympics
Ice hockey players at the 1928 Winter Olympics
Olympic ice hockey players of France
People from the Russian Empire of German descent
People from Warsaw Governorate
Sportspeople from Warsaw